Francis Edward Gladstone (2 March 1845 – 6 September 1928) in Summertown, Oxford, was an English organist. He was related to the politician William Ewart Gladstone.

Career

He was a pupil of Samuel Sebastian Wesley at Winchester Cathedral. He earned his Mus.Doc. at Cambridge University.

He was 
Organist of Holy Trinity Church, Weston-super-Mare 1864-66
Organist of Llandaff Cathedral 1866-70
Organist of Chichester Cathedral 1870-73
Organist of St Patrick's Church, Hove 1873-75
Organist of St Peter's Church, Brighton 1875-76
Organist of St. Mark's Church, Lewisham 1876-77
Organist of Norwich Cathedral 1877-81
Director of Music of St Mary of the Angels, Bayswater 1881–94.

He was also Professor of Organ (1885–99) at the Royal College of Music and Professor of Harmony and Counterpoint there from 1884 to 1910.

He died in Hereford. An obituary observed: "He loved to be well prepared in everything. It was exactly like him, not only to have written the composition for his own funeral but to have coached the monks beforehand who were to sing it."

References

1845 births
1928 deaths
People from Oxford
Organists & Masters of the Choristers of Chichester Cathedral
Cathedral organists